Guy Powell (1851–1900) was a pastor and state legislator in Virginia. He served in the Senate of Virginia from 1875 to 1879 and in the Virginia House of Delegates from 1881 to 1883.

He married Mary Ann Rylan January 27, 1869.

See also
African-American officeholders during and following the Reconstruction era

References

1851 births
1900 deaths
Members of the Virginia House of Delegates
Virginia state senators
African-American politicians during the Reconstruction Era